Kaplan Business School is an Australian independent higher education institution. It started offering degrees in Adelaide in 2008 before expanding across Australia to the other major state capital cities. It is part of Kaplan International, headquartered in London, which is a division of Kaplan Inc., a wholly owned subsidiary of Graham Holdings Company, formerly known as The Washington Post Company.

The Australian Government's regulator of higher education institutions, the Tertiary Education Quality and Standards Agency (TEQSA), re-registered Kaplan Business School as a Higher Education Provider in 2020 for the maximum seven-year period with no conditions, commending it in the areas of student support and feedback, academic progression of students, academic policy and practice, and its approach to academic integrity.  TEQSA also re-accredited all of its postgraduate courses in 2019 for the maximum seven-year period.

Kaplan Business School operates from seven CRICOS-registered campuses in Adelaide, Brisbane, Melbourne, Perth and Sydney, and offers accredited postgraduate programs in business, accounting and business analytics, and accredited undergraduates courses in a number of business-related academic disciplines including accounting, management, marketing, and hospitality and tourism management.

According to Department of Education data, Kaplan Business School had 4,289 enrolled students in 2019, with approximately two thirds enrolled in postgraduate degrees, making it the second largest non-university business school in Australia. 

The Master of Business Administration (MBA) is its flagship program and fastest growing course. It can be studied wholly online or blended with face-to-face lectures, and in 2019, increasing enrolments resulted in it becoming the third most popular MBA program in Australia with 2,134 students, overtaking the University of New South Wales, Southern Cross University, Torrens University and Deakin University. The MBA program received global recognition when it was a Highly Commended runner-up in the Progressive Education Delivery category of the 2020 PIEonner Awards, run by The PIE News to celebrate innovation and achievement across the worldwide international education industry.  

Kaplan Business School also received global recognition for its student support and welfare services, winning the Student Support category of the 2021 PIEonner Awards for its COVID-19 Student Welfare Plan, being a Highly Commended runner-up in the Employability International Impact category of the 2020 Awards, and being a finalist in the Student Support category of the 2019 Awards. In addition, it was recognized by the NSW Government, through being a finalist in its NSW International Student Awards in both 2020 and 2021, while in the 2020 Australian Financial Review Higher Education Awards, Kaplan was the only non-university provider among the 36 shortlisted for an award.

Student satisfaction is above the national sector average, particularly in the areas of teaching quality and student support services, according to Department of Education's Quality Indicators for Learning and Teaching (QILT) Student Experience Survey. Recent graduate satisfaction is also above the national average, and the QILT Graduate Outcomes Survey reported that graduates from Kaplan Business School postgraduate programs had higher graduate employment rates and median salaries than the higher education sector average.

In 2020, Kaplan Business School expanded its national footprint by expanding into a fifth state, Western Australia, by opening a new campus in Perth despite the COVID-19 crisis, becoming one of only a few non-university providers to offer postgraduate business courses in Perth.

References

External links
 Kaplan Business School Official Website
 Kaplan Australia and New Zealand Official Website

Business schools in Australia
Australian tertiary institutions
Education companies of Australia